Christoffel Coetzee de Villiers (10 March 1850 – 4 September 1887), born in Swellendam as the fourth son of a wagon-maker, and married in Wellington where he then settled, spent his last years as a printer's clerk in Cape Town. His passion for researching his own family's history eventually grew into his compilation of Geslachts-Registers der Oude Kaapsche Familiën, a complete (in so far as it was possible) genealogy of colonists' descendants born at the Colony of the Cape of Good Hope during the Dutch period (1652–1806).

He died of pneumonia with his life's work uncompleted and leaving his family in penury, having expended all his resources on his research. On his death-bed, he extracted a promise from his friend and mentor, the historian George McCall Theal, to finish the work and have it published.

Oude Kaapsche Familiën 

The publication, financed by the Cape Government at Theal's insistence, had to wait until a few years after Theal's appointment (in 1891) as Colonial Historian. Only the first volume was sponsored, though: publication of the two others was conditional on sales of the first recovering its production cost. The public's reception was overwhelming and the three volumes are now collector's items. They set a standard of scholarship, aspired to but rarely equalled by later genealogists, and remain a standard reference work well over a century later.

References 

1850 births
1887 deaths
People from Beaufort West
South African genealogists
19th-century South African writers